Lamberto Tronchin (born 27 March 1964, Preganziol) is an Italian acoustician, engineer, theorist, musician, and professor of musical acoustics and environmental physics at the University of Bologna. 

Biography 
He was graduated at University of Bologna in Civil and Building Engineering in 1992 and after having studied at Conservatory of Ferrara and Venice, he received the Diploma in Piano performance at Conservatory of Reggio Emilia. Afterwards, he obtained the PhD in room acoustics in 1995 and was enrolled as assistant professor in 1999 at University of Bologna and as associate professor at the same university in 2011.
He teaches musical acoustics at University of Bologna (DAMS). 
He worked as acoustic consultant in a number of projects regarding theatres, auditorium and buildings with a number of architects, including Richard Meier, Paolo Portoghesi, Paolo Bandiera, Francesco Bandiera, Giovanni Farolfi, Riccarda Cantarelli, and Luisella Pennati.

He made the unique acoustic measurements in the former Teatro La Fenice, in Venice, before its burning which occurred 29 January 1996.

His contribution on musical acoustics includes the definition of a new parameter, the Intensity of Acoustic Radiation (IAR) that established a link between modal analysis of soundboards of musical instruments and their sound emission. His researches were reported in a number of articles and lectures, including TV programs in the Arté television broadcasting company.
His researches about non linearity on musical acoustics allowed to release a patent about the emulation of non linear behavior of musical instruments and devices.

Selection of projects and works 
 Theatre Comunale, Gradisca d'Isonzo (1994)
 Theatre La Fenice, Venice (1995)
 Auditorium Del Carmine, Parma (1997)
 Theatre Pergine Spettacolo Aperto, Pergine (1997)
 Auditorium San Domenico, Foligno (1998)
 Parco Acquatico "Le Navi", Cattolica (2000)
 Auditorium Forum Guido Monzani, Modena (2001)
 Auditorium, Firenzuola (2001)
 Auditorium, Impruneta (2002)
 Theatre Comunale, Treviso (2003–05)
 Theatre Nuovo, Spoleto (2004–06)
 Theatre Eschilo, Gela (2008–09)
 Jesolo Lido Condo Building (2009–11)
 Theatre Galli, Rimini (2009–13)

Awardes and patents 
 13 Mostra internazionale dell'architettura - Venice - Biennale dell'Architettura di Venezia, 2012 - Polish Pavilion - Special Mention "This brave and bold installation reminds the visitor to listen as well as to look... And to feel the sound of the Common Ground"
 METHOD FOR ARTIFICIALLY REPRODUCING AN OUTPUT SIGNAL OF A NON-LINEAR TIME INVARIANT SYSTEM 
 The "Tuned City" project: lecture at Wiels, Brussels

Bibliography

References 

1964 births
Living people